Lucidadiol is a bio-active sterol isolated from Ganoderma.

References

Sterols